Luxiol is a commune in the Doubs department in the Bourgogne-Franche-Comté region in eastern France.

It was the place of the Roman Loposagium.

Population

See also
 Christian Dornier, spree killer who killed 14 people.
 Communes of the Doubs department

References

External links

 Luxiol on the intercommunal Web site of the department 

Communes of Doubs
Sequani